Rogers Sugar Inc. is the Canadian holding company of Lantic Inc., which was established in June 2008 after the merger of Lantic Sugar Limited operating in Montreal, QC (Eastern Canada) and Rogers Sugar Ltd. (operating in Western Canada). It is the largest refined sugar distributor in Canada. Established as Rogers Sugar Income Fund in October 1997, the income trust was converted to a regular corporation named Rogers Sugar Inc. in January 2011.

History
The merged entity of today initially began as separate companies on both the east coast and west coast of Canada. The original Rogers Sugar company was established in Vancouver as the British Columbia Sugar Refining Company in 1890 by its American-born founder, Benjamin Tingley Rogers (1865–1918), whose father was president of E.J. Gay’s Sugar of New Orleans.

Atlantic Sugar Refineries was established in 1912 from the merger of three sugar refineries, including Acadia Sugar Refining Co. (established 1893 in Halifax), and later renamed as Lantic Sugar Limited. The company was owned from 1981 to 1990 by Steinberg's. In 1984, Lantic Sugar acquired St. Lawrence Sugar, which had been established in 1888 in Montreal. Lantic Inc. was created from the merger of Rogers Sugar and Lantic Sugar on June 30, 2008.

Facilities

The combined company operates the following facilities:

 Montreal cane refinery: Located in Montreal, the refinery was originally built in 1888 by St. Lawrence Sugar.
 Vancouver cane refinery: Located in the Port of Vancouver, the Vancouver facility primarily processes imported sugar cane into sugar products.
 Taber sugar beet factory: Located in Taber, Alberta, this plant processes sugar beet into sugar products.  The plant contracts with nearly 400 farmers each year to plant and grow sugar beets.
 Toronto Distribution Centre: Located in New Toronto at 198 New Toronto Street, this warehouse receives processed sugar by rail and distributes it for the Ontario region. The warehouse also stores liquid sugar in tanks and is a liquid sucrose melt facility.
 Toronto Blending operation: Located in Scarborough at 230 Midwest Road, this  facility is used for bulk dry blending services.

References

External links

The story of Rogers Sugar 

Companies listed on the Toronto Stock Exchange
Food and drink companies based in Vancouver
Sugar companies
Canadian companies established in 1997
Food and drink companies established in 1997